Bojan Letić (born 21 December 1992) is a Bosnian professional footballer who plays as a left-back for Sabah.

Club career

Early career
Letić started off his career at Kozara Gradiška where he played in the 2011–12 Bosnian Premier League season. After Kozara, he played for a short time at Borac Šamac in the First League of RS, before signing with Velež Mostar where he spent a year and a half.

Žilina
On 17 July 2014, Slovak Super Liga club Žilina announced that they had reached an agreement for the transfer of Letić, who signed a three-year deal. He made his professional debut for Žilina against Košice on 20 July 2014. While at Žilina, he simultaneously played for the second team of Žilina B in the 2. Liga. 

In the 2016–17 Slovak Super Liga season, Letić won the league title with Žilina and won his first professional trophy. In August 2017, he left Žilina.

Karviná
Shortly after leaving Žilina, on 17 August 2017, Letić signed with Czech First League club Karviná.

He made his debut for Karviná on 26 August 2017, in a 0–1 home league loss against Slovan Liberec, coming in as a 77th minute substitute for former teammate Peter Štepanovský.

It was announced that Letić was leaving Karviná in June 2019.

Sarajevo
On 2 July 2019, Letić signed a two year contract with Bosnian Premier League club Sarajevo. He made his official debut for Sarajevo on 28 July 2019, in a 0–0 away league draw against Čelik Zenica. Letić decided to terminate his contract and leave Sarajevo on 16 January 2020.

Mirandés
On 6 August 2020, after a short stint at FK Radnički Niš, Letić agreed to a two-year deal with CD Mirandés in the Spanish Segunda División. On 31 January 2022, he terminated his contract with the club.

Sabah
On 18 February 2022, Sabah announced the signing of Letić on a contract until the end of the 2021–22 season.

International career
Letić played for the Bosnia and Herzegovina U21 national team between 2013 and 2014. He made 6 appearances but did not score a goal.

Honours
Žilina 
Slovak Super Liga: 2016–17

References

External links
 
 
 Bojan Letić profile at Futbalnet 
 B. Letić profile at eurofotbal.cz

1992 births
Living people
People from Brčko District
Association football defenders
Bosnia and Herzegovina footballers
Bosnia and Herzegovina under-21 international footballers
FK Kozara Gradiška players
FK Borac Šamac players
FK Velež Mostar players
MŠK Žilina players
MFK Karviná players
FK Sarajevo players
FK Radnički Niš players
CD Mirandés footballers
Premier League of Bosnia and Herzegovina players
Serbian SuperLiga players
Slovak Super Liga players
Slovenian Second League players
Czech First League players
Segunda División players
Bosnia and Herzegovina expatriate footballers
Expatriate footballers in Slovakia
Bosnia and Herzegovina expatriate sportspeople in Slovakia
Expatriate footballers in the Czech Republic
Bosnia and Herzegovina expatriate sportspeople in the Czech Republic
Expatriate footballers in Serbia
Bosnia and Herzegovina expatriate sportspeople in Serbia
Expatriate footballers in Spain
Bosnia and Herzegovina expatriate sportspeople in Spain
Serbs of Bosnia and Herzegovina